Huertas is a Spanish surname. Notable people with the surname include:

Adrián Huertas (born 2003), Spanish motorcycle racer
Antonio Huertas, Spanish chief executive
Antonio Escobar Huertas (1879–1940), Spanish military officer
Begoña Huertas (1965–2022), Spanish writer and journalist
Carlos Huertas (born 1991), Colombian racing driver
Carlos Huertas (vallenato composer) (1934–1999), Colombian musician
David Huertas (born 1987), Puerto Rican basketball player
Esteban Huertas (1876–1943), Panamanian military officer
Guy de Huertas (1926–1997), French alpine skier
Joel Huertas (born 1995), Spanish football player
Jon Huertas (born 1969), American actor
Jorge Arturo Mendoza Huertas (born 1971), Peruvian mental calculator
José Huertas González (born 1946), Puerto Rican wrestler
Juan Huertas, Panamanian boxer
Liliana del Carmen La Rosa Huertas (born 1964), Peruvian nurse, academic and government minister
Marcelo Huertas (born 1983), Brazilian basketball player
Marially González Huertas, Puerto Rican politician
Mávila Huertas (born 1970), Peruvian journalist
Miguel Huertas (born 1977), Peruvian football player
Raphel Ortiz Huertas (born 1975), Puerto Rican football player
Raquel Huertas (born 1982), Spanish field hockey player

See also
21636 Huertas, a main-belt asteroid
Huerta (surname)
Huerta (disambiguation)

Spanish-language surnames